Big Dick Lake is a natural lake in Itasca County, Minnesota, in the United States. It is located within Chippewa National Forest.

See also
List of lakes in Minnesota

References

Lakes of Minnesota
Lakes of Itasca County, Minnesota